Al-Aman Bahela Khatun Mosque (Bengali: আল-আমান বাহেলা খাতুন জামে মসজিদ) is a mosque located at Belkuchi,  southeast of Sirajganj in Bangladesh. This Mosque is a traditional mosque built on 20 and a half bighas of land on the west side of Sirajganj-Enayetpur road in Mukandganti mahalla of ward 08 of Belkuchi municipality area. A large banner at the mosque gate said no to taking pictures and no women entering the mosque. 

The mosque strangely working how beautifully designed a mosque  possibly beautiful mosque.  In September 2016, Mohammad Ali Sarkar of Mukundagati village laid the foundation stone of Al-Aman Bahela Khatun Jame Mosque Complex in Belkuchi in the name of his son Al-Aman and mother Bahela Khatun.  He built the mosque at his own expense, spending more than Tk 30 crore. It took four years to build. From the beginning, an average of 45 workers have worked every day.

History
In September 2016, Mohammad Ali Sarkar, of Mukundagati village, laid the foundation stone of Al-Aman Bahela Khatun Jame Mosque Complex in the name of his son Al-Aman and mother Bahela Khatun on 2.5 bighas of land south of Belkuchi Municipality. He built the mosque at his own expense at a cost of over Tk 30 crore. It took four years to build. From the beginning, an average of 45 workers have worked every day.

Architecture
The mosque has a large gray dome. In addition, the floor is covered with white tiles and pillars are covered with marble. On the third floor of the mosque there are domes and in other places there are several lighted chandeliers. The mosque is surrounded by white pillars, high windows, white tiles and green grass in the courtyard.

Location 

References

Mosques in Bangladesh
Buildings and structures in Rajshahi Division
Mosques completed in 2021
2021 establishments in Bangladesh
Sirajganj District